This page covers a group of dicotyledon families of the clade Superrosids. For the background to this list see parent article List of the vascular plants of Britain and Ireland.

Status key: * indicates an introduced species and e indicates an extinct species.
This division of the eudicots is shown in the following cladogram:

Order Saxifragales

Family Grossulariaceae (currant family)

Family Haloragaceae (watermilfoil family)

Family Crassulaceae (stonecrop or orpine family)

Family Saxifragaceae (saxifrage family)

Family Paeoniaceae (peonies)

Rosids

Order Vitales

Family Vitaceae (grape family)

Fabids

Order Rosales

Family Ulmaceae (elm family)

Family Cannabaceae (hemp family)

Family Moraceae (mulberry family, fig family)

Family Urticaceae (nettle family)

Family Rosaceae (rose family)

Order Fagales

Family Juglandaceae (walnut family)

Family Myricaceae (wax myrtle family)

Family Fagaceae (beech and oak family)

Family Betulaceae (birch family)

Family Amaranthaceae (amaranth family)

Family Portulacaceae (purslane family)

Family Caryophyllaceae (pink and carnation family)

Family Polygonaceae (knotweed family)

Family Plumbaginaceae (leadwort family)

Family Droseraceae (sundew family)

Family Tamaricaceae (tamarisk family)

Family Frankeniaceae (sea-heath)

Order Malpighiales

Family Elatinaceae (waterworts)

Family Clusiaceae (garcinia family)

Family Violaceae (violet and pansy family)

Family Salicaceae (willow family)

Malvids

Order Malvales

Family Malvaceae (mallows)

Family Cistaceae (rock-rose family)

Order Brassicales

Family Brassicaceae (mustards, crucifers, cabbage family)

Family Resedaceae

Order Ericales

Family Ericaceae (heath, heather)

Family Diapensiaceae (diapensia family)

Family Primulaceae (primrose family)

Family Sarraceniaceae (carnivorous pitcher plants)

Order Fabales

Family Fabaceae (legumes, peas, beans)

Family Polygalaceae (milkworts)

Order Malvales

Family Thymelaeaceae (fibre bark family)

Family Myrtaceae (myrtle family)

Family Onagraceae (willowherb or evening primrose family)

Order Cornales

Family Cornaceae (dogwood family)

Order Celastrales

Family Celastraceae (staff vine or bittersweet family)

Order Buxales

Family Buxaceae (boxwood family)

Order Rosales

Family Elaeagnaceae (oleaster family)

Family Rhamnaceae (buckthorn family)

Order Malpighiales

Family Euphorbiaceae (spurge family)

Family Linaceae (flax family)

Order Cucurbitales

Family Cucurbitaceae (gourd family)

Order Celastrales

Family Celastraceae (staff vine or bittersweet family)

Family Berberidaceae (barberry family)

Family Papaveraceae (poppies)

Order Oxalidales

Family Oxalidaceae (wood sorrel family)

Order Geraniales

Family Geraniaceae (geranium family)

Order Brassicales

Family Tropaeolaceae (nasturtiums)

Order Myrtales

Family Lythraceae (loosestrife family)

Order Crossosomatales

Family Staphyleaceae (bladdernut family)

Order Sapindales

Family Sapindaceae (soapberry family)

Family Anacardiaceae (cashew or sumach family)

Family Simaroubaceae

Order Gentianales

Family Gentianaceae (gentian family)

Family Apocynaceae (dogbane family)

Family Rubiaceae (coffee, madder or bedstraw family)

Order Solanales

Family Solanaceae (nightshade family)

Family Convolvulaceae (bindweed or morning glory family)

Order Boraginales

Family Boraginaceae (borage or forget-me-not family)

Order Lamiales

Family Verbenaceae (vervain family)

Family Lamiaceae (mint or deadnettle family)

Family Plantaginaceae (plantain family)

Family Scrophulariaceae (figwort family)

Family Oleaceae (olive family)

Family Phrymaceae (lopseed family)

Family Calceolariaceae

Family Orobanchaceae (broomrapes)

Family Gesneriaceae (African violet family)

Family Acanthaceae (acanthus family)

Family Lentibulariaceae (bladderwort family)

Family Campanulaceae (bellflower family)

Notes

 Recurved sandwort (Minuartia recurva) is found only in Ireland.
 Corn spurrey (Spergula arvensis) is an archaeophyte in Britain and Ireland; a native population exists on the Channel Islands

References

06